Myrna Fahey (March 12, 1933 – May 6, 1973) was an American actress known for her role as Maria Crespo in Walt Disney's Zorro and as Madeline Usher in The Fall of the House of Usher.

She appeared in episodes of 37 television series from the 1950s into the 1970s, including Bonanza, Wagon Train, The Time Tunnel with Robert Colbert, Maverick with James Garner, 77 Sunset Strip with Efrem Zimbalist Jr., Laramie, Gunsmoke with James Arness, The Adventures of Superman with George Reeves, Kraft Suspense Theatre, Daniel Boone with Fess Parker, Perry Mason with Raymond Burr, and Batman with Adam West and Burt Ward.

Early years
Myrna Elisabeth Fahey was born in Carmel, Maine, near Bangor, the youngest of three children for Francis Edward Fahey and Olivia Newcomb. She attended Carmel Grammar School until age six, along with her older brothers. By early 1940 the family had moved to Southwest Harbor, where her father took a job at the Manset Boat Yard.

As a youngster she was active in the Girl Scouts, swimming, acrobatics, and took dancing lessons. Fahey did her secondary education at Pemetic High School in Southwest Harbor, where she performed in musicals, plays, and took part in public speaking events. Despite her short stature, she was athletic, outscoring all other girls in her school to win a state-level Girls Athletic Association award. She took part in her school's wilderness exploring club, was a cheerleader for four years, and captain of the girl's undefeated varsity basketball team.

Drama school and beauty pageants
She graduated from high school in June 1951 and worked briefly at a retail job in Bangor. The following October she enrolled at the Pasadena Playhouse Unable to find acting work after her drama school stint, she returned to Maine in late spring 1952. Having been chosen Miss Mount Desert Island 1950 and Miss Poultry Queen of Hancock County 1951 while in high school, she decided to enter the Miss Maine pageant. At the state fair in August 1952, representing Bangor, she came in first runner-up to winner Norma Lee Collins. Fahey immediately entered another beauty pageant the following month, winning the Miss Maine Cosmetology 1952 title.

Start in television

Her placement in the Miss Maine contests brought her to the attention of Hollywood scouts. Encouraged by their overtures, she returned to California and found work at local television station KHJ in Los Angeles. She served as one of the fashion model hostesses on Queen for a Day and did photo shoots and general publicity events for the station's advertisers and other programs. Her first real acting job was for a television anthology series, Cavalcade of America, appearing on episode "Margin for Victory".

Fahey continued doing occasional work on KHJ through 1954. She also did fashion modeling for the Broadway department store. Her first real break came in March 1955 when Warner Brothers gave her a small uncredited part in what was then called A Handful of Clouds but was later released as I Died a Thousand Times. She did well enough in her first film that the studio also used her for its premiere television program, Warner Brothers Presents. This show had three rotating series; Myrna Fahey had a feature role in the first episode of King's Row starring Jack Kelly and Robert Horton.

Interlude
However, the Warners job finished during summer 1955, so Myrna Fahey committed to an extended publicity campaign for the title of Miss Rheingold. This commercial beauty contest lasted from August through October 1955. It featured six "finalists", all aspiring actresses, whom the general public could vote for at various venues around the country. Though she didn't win, Myrna Fahey received a lot of national publicity from personal appearances and newspaper photos. Publicity of a different sort came from syndicated columnist Harrison Carroll, who reported in December 1955 that she was at the Cocoanut Grove night club with Frank Sinatra associate Nick Sevano.

In January 1956, Myrna Fahey was selected to be a "Baby Star", a short-lived attempt to revive the old WAMPAS annual tradition. It fizzled, and so did Myrna's career for the rest of the year. She had no performing work, and was relegated to doing "hostess" bits for public events.

Breakthrough
With the beginning of 1957 Myrna had a steady stream of film and television work, though her roles in the former were still small and uncredited. She moved from Burbank to a large apartment in Beverly Hills that she shared with her mother, and registered as a Republican.  

Matinee Theater, an anthology series that presented a new hour-long movie every afternoon, was her mainstay for television work at this time. She did many of these live original productions during 1957, though the titles of some are no longer known. Myrna Fahey also did a lot of work for Disney Studios in the fall of 1957 that would not be released or broadcast until the following year. Starting about this time some columnists compared Myrna Fahey's looks with Elizabeth Taylor, though Myrna had bright green eyes quite unlike Taylor's distinctive violet.

At the end of 1957 Myrna Fahey had her first professional stage role, with a principal part in the Pasadena Playhouse production of Holiday for Lovers, later made into a 1959 film. Reviewer Franklin Argyle said "Myrna Fahey (Betsy Dean) is a fine actress confined to a lightweight part".

Later life
Fahey became an avid skier in California. She invested in stocks and one of her contracts stipulated that she have a stock ticker in her dressing room. In addition to dating baseball player Joe DiMaggio, she dated actor George Hamilton.

Fahey became the subject of death threats while dating baseball great Joe DiMaggio in 1964. The FBI determined the threats came from a patient at the Agnews Developmental Center, a mental hospital in San Jose, California. Apparently the patient could not bear to see DiMaggio with anyone other than Marilyn Monroe, who died in 1962.

Fahey died on May 6, 1973, at age 40, at St. John's Hospital in Santa Monica, after a long battle with cancer. She is buried in Mt. Pleasant Cemetery in Bangor, Maine.

Film and television work
Fahey complained in a 1960 interview that she was being typecast in "good girl" roles because of what directors called her "moral overtones," even though she wanted to play darker and more complicated characters. She had worked in many Westerns in the late 1950s, usually in the role of the sheriff's daughter, including an appearance on Gunsmoke in 1958 (an episode entitled: "Innocent Broad"). She also appeared in a supporting role in "Duel at Sundown", a notable episode of Maverick with James Garner featuring Clint Eastwood as a trigger-happy villain. In another appearance in ‘‘Maverick’’ she starred as Dee Cooper, the owner of a cattle ranch, in conflict with Maverick’s herd of sheep. She starred in two episodes of Wagon Train, "The Jane Hawkins Story" (1960) and "The Melanie Craig Story" (1964), and an episode of Straightaway, "Troubleshooter," in 1961. Her image branched out in the 1960s, helped by House of Usher and a role on the Boris Karloff TV series Thriller that same year entitled "Girl with a Secret". Even her Western parts became "darker." After a rough love scene in the 1960 episode of Bonanza "Breed of Violence", in which she cut her lip, the cast presented her with an award for "Best Slapper in a Filmed Series".

Fahey's most sustained television work was a starring role in the one-season (1961–62) series Father of the Bride, based on a film of the same name starring Spencer Tracy and Elizabeth Taylor. Fahey likely got the role because, as one newspaper reviewer pointed out, she "looks enough like Liz Taylor to be her sister." Fahey was not flattered by the comparison, however, telling one interviewer "the fact that I'm supposed to look like Elizabeth Whats-Her-Name had nothing to do with my getting [the part], because we don't really look alike I don't think, we just happen to have the same colorings." Fahey wanted to be released from the show even before it came up for renewal, reportedly feeling too much emphasis was being placed on the "father" character and not enough on her "bride". She also portrayed Jennifer Ivers on the TV version of Peyton Place.

Fahey made four guest appearances on the drama series Perry Mason: Lydia Logan in the 1960 episode, "The Case of the Nimble Nephew"; defendant Grace Halley in the 1961 episode "The Case of the Violent Vest"; murder victim Myrna Warren in the 1965 episode "The Case of the Gambling Lady"; and defendant Holly Andrews in the 1966 episode "The Case of the Midnight Howler". In 1966, she played Blaze in the Batman episodes "True or False-Face" and "Holy Rat Race".

Filmography

References

External links

 
 
 Myrna Fahey on Zorro

1933 births
1973 deaths
American film actresses
American television actresses
Burials in Maine
People from Penobscot County, Maine
People from Mount Desert Island
20th-century American actresses
Deaths from cancer in California